Aleh is a transliteration from Belarusian Алег of the Eastern Slavic name Oleg. It is sometimes spelled as "Aleg".

Notable people

Jo Aleh (born 1986), New Zealand sailor, national champion, world champion, Olympic champion

Places
Pareh Aleh, a village in Iran

Belarusian masculine given names